The National Latin Exam is a test given to Latin students. Sponsored by the U.S.-based American Classical League and the National Junior Classical League, the exam was given in 2012 to over 136,000 students in the U.S., Australia, Canada, China, France, Germany, Iran, Italy, Japan, New Zealand, Poland, United Kingdom, Zimbabwe, and—for the first time—Taiwan. The test covers general knowledge of Latin grammar and vocabulary, mythology, Roman culture, derivatives, and translation abilities.

The office of the National Latin Exam is located in James Farmer Hall on the campus of the University of Mary Washington in Fredericksburg, Virginia.

Philosophy
The philosophy of the National Latin Exam is predicated on providing every Latin student the opportunity to experience a sense of personal accomplishment and success in their study of the Latin language and culture. This opportunity exists for all students on the National Latin Exam since they are not competing with their fellow students on a comparative basis, but are evaluated solely on their own performance on the exam. The basic purposes of the NLE are to promote the study of Latin and to encourage the individual student.

Format
The National Latin Exam is a forty-question, multiple-choice test with a time limit of forty-five minutes; it is offered to students on seven levels.

On the Introduction to Latin, Latin I, Latin II, Latin III, Latin III/IV Prose, and Latin III/IV Poetry exams, there are questions on grammar, comprehension, mythology, derivatives, literature, Roman life, history, geography, oral Latin, and Latin in use in the modern world.

The Latin V-VI exam contains two Latin passages as the basis for questions on grammar, comprehension, historical background, classical literature, and literary devices.

The exam is scored based on the number of questions answered correctly, with no penalty for guessing.

While a student can take an exam for a higher level than the one in which they are currently enrolled, the student may not take any level below their completion. The student is not required to take an actual Latin class to take an exam; however, the student must have an official sponsor to take an exam. The test can either be taken in person or online.

Awards

Several awards are available to those students who excel on the NLE:

Medals and Certificates 

For Latin I-VI+:
 Perfect paper: Hand-lettered certificate
 Gold medal and a summa cum laude certificate awarded to top scorers
 Silver medal and a maxima cum laude certificate to second-place winners
 Magna cum laude certificate to third-place winners
 Cum Laude certificate to fourth-place winners

For Introduction to Latin:
 Perfect Paper: Purple certificate of achievement 
 A gold outstanding achievement certificate and a purple outstanding achievement ribbon for top scorers
 Silver certificate of achievement for second-place winners 

An NLE Certificate of Merit is also provided for each school participating in the exam.

Carter Stubbs Drake Goad Award (Latin I-VI+) 

The students who have three, four, or five years of perfect papers are sent special book awards in addition to the special certificate. The perfect papers must be for ascending levels of the exam exclusive of the Introduction to Latin exam.

The Maureen O'Donnell Oxford Classical Dictionary Award (Latin I-VI+) 

The Maureen O’Donnell Oxford Classical Dictionary Award is given to students who win four gold medals in recognition of their outstanding achievement. The students who have won five gold medals will be sent special book awards.

Scholarships
The National Latin Exam offers three different types of scholarships:

NLE Scholarships

Seniors who win a gold medal on the Latin III, III-IV Prose, III-IV Poetry, or the Latin V-VI+ exam are eligible to apply for one of twenty-one $2,000 scholarships awarded annually. Those who apply must agree to take a least one course per semester of Latin or Classical Greek in their first year of college. Recipients may reapply, if they continue their study of Latin or Greek.

NLE Graduate Scholarship

Students or teachers who are continuing their Latin or Greek on the post-graduate level are eligible to apply for one $2,000 scholarship awarded annually.

The Jane Harriman Hall Professional Development Scholarship

The Jane Harriman Hall Professional Development Scholarship program is designed to support teachers in their ability to teach Latin.  The scholarship was developed in honor of Jane Harriman Hall, founder of the National Latin Exam, in order to continue her efforts to bring high quality Latin instruction to their students.

See also
National French Contest
National Spanish Examinations

Notes

External links

National Latin Exam (NLE)

American Classical League
Latin language tests